Lu Wucheng (born May 1953) is a former Chinese official who spent most of his career in Gansu province. He was the vice Chairman of the Standing Committee of the Gansu Provincial People's Congress and Communist Party Secretary of Lanzhou. Lu also was the member of 12th National People's Congress. On January 23, 2015, Lu Wucheng was placed under investigation by the Communist Party's anti-corruption agency. He was the first high-ranking politician being examined from Gansu province after the 18th Party Congress in 2012.

Career
Lu Wucheng was born and raised in Qingcheng County, Gansu. He joined Chinese Communist Party in 1974. He was the student of Lanzhou Public Security School and the policeman of Lanzhou Public Security Bureau. In 1996, Lu went to Jinchang, became the vice Communist Party Secretary and mayor. In July 2008, Lu Wucheng become Communist Party Secretary of Lanzhou. On January 29, 2013, he became the Vice Chairman of the Standing Committee of the Gansu Provincial People's Congress.

On January 23, 2015, Lu Wencheng was placed under investigation by the Central Commission for Discipline Inspection for "serious violations of laws and regulations". Lu was expelled from the Communist Party on May 15.

On November 17, 2016, Lu was sentenced to 12 years and 6 months in prison for bribery.

References

1953 births
People from Qingyang
Living people
Political office-holders in Gansu
Chinese Communist Party politicians from Gansu
People's Republic of China politicians from Gansu
Expelled members of the Chinese Communist Party
Chinese politicians convicted of corruption